Erivonaldo Florencio de Oliveira Filho (born May 12, 1990 in Caruaru), known as Naldinho, is a Brazilian footballer who plays for Tabajara FC as a midfielder.

Career statistics

References

External links

1990 births
Living people
Brazilian footballers
Association football midfielders
Campeonato Brasileiro Série A players
Campeonato Brasileiro Série B players
Campeonato Brasileiro Série C players
Campeonato Brasileiro Série D players
Sport Club do Recife players
São Bernardo Futebol Clube players
ABC Futebol Clube players